Li Hongli (born 26 December 1980 in Ningyuan, Yongzhou, Hunan, China) is a Chinese weightlifter. He is 168 cm tall.

At the 2003 World Weightlifting Championships, Li Hongli won the bronze medal in the 77 kg category, with a total of 352.5 kg, after Gevorg Davtyan was tested positive for banned substances and lost his silver medal.

Li competed in the men's 77 kg class at the 2005 World Weightlifting Championships and won the gold medal. He snatched 165 kg and clean and jerked 196 kg for a total of 361 kg.

Li participated in the 77 kg category at the 2006 World Weightlifting Championships and won the silver medal, finishing behind Taner Sagir. He snatched 167 kg and clean and jerked an additional 192 kg for a total of 359 kg.

At the 2007 World Weightlifting Championships he won the bronze medal in the 77 kg category, with a total of 361 kg.

He won the silver medal in the 77 kg category at the 2008 Summer Olympics, with a total of 366 kg.

References

External links 
 Athlete Biography at beijing2008

1980 births
Living people
Olympic silver medalists for China
Olympic weightlifters of China
People from Yongzhou
Weightlifters at the 2008 Summer Olympics
Place of birth missing (living people)
Olympic medalists in weightlifting
Asian Games medalists in weightlifting
Weightlifters from Hunan
Weightlifters at the 2002 Asian Games
Weightlifters at the 2006 Asian Games
Medalists at the 2008 Summer Olympics
Chinese male weightlifters
Asian Games gold medalists for China
Medalists at the 2006 Asian Games
World Weightlifting Championships medalists
21st-century Chinese people